Gu Vo, also known as Cubo, Kerwo, or Kuvo, is a populated place situated in Pima County, Arizona, United States. Gu Vo became the official name as a result of a Board on Geographic Names decision in 1941.

References

Populated places in Pima County, Arizona